Chevalier de La Règle was a French Navy officer. He notably served in Suffren's squadron during the Anglo-French War.

Biography 
Du Pas joined the Navy as a Garde-Marine on 19 January 1757. He was promoted to Lieutenant on 4 April 1777, and to Captain on 15 September 1782.

La Règle arrived in the Indian Ocean with the first wave of reinforcements set there after Suffren took command of the squadron, as first officer on the 74-gun Illustre under Captain Bruyères-Chalabre.  

He later captained the 64-gun Ajax. 

In the run-up to the Battle of Trincomalee, on 25 August 1782, Du Pas led four companies of marines to lay siege to the forts of Trincomalee.

On 9 February 1783, Suffren appointed him to the command of the 64-gun Ajax. He was killed at his station during the battle, as Ajax was bearing to HMS Inflexible.

After the war, Bruyères was praised by Bruyères, and he was amongst the captains that Suffren recommended for promotion.  He received a 600-livre pension in recognition of his service.

Sources and references 
 Notes

References

 Bibliography 
 
 

French Navy officers